Tian Qing (born 19 August 1986) is a Chinese badminton player specializing in doubles.

Career 
Tian Qing started to practice badminton with her father Tian Jianyi who also a badminton coach in Anhua Sports School at aged 7. In 1998, she moved to Hunan Province Sports School and in 2004, she competed at the World Junior Championships and win gold in the girls' doubles event teamed-up with Yu Yang. In 2006, she joined the national team. In her early career at the national team, she was partnered with Pan Pan, and they participated in the 2009 World Championships, and 2010 Uber Cup.

In 2010, she competed at the 2010 Guangzhou Asian Games in the mixed team and women's doubles event partnered with Zhao Yunlei, where she won two gold medals respectively. At the same year, she also competed in the mixed doubles event partnered with Tao Jiaming, and they were won the titles at the China Masters and China Open. She also won the women's doubles title at the Swiss Open with Yu Yang and a gold medal at the Asia Championships with Pan Pan. In 2011, she set to teamed-up with Zhao Yunlei, and they managed to win the women's doubles title at the Malaysia and Singapore Open. They also won silver medal at the 2011 BWF World Championships and ensure to compete at the 2012 London Olympics.

In London 2012, she and Zhao won the women's doubles gold after outplayed Mizuki Fujii and Reika Kakiiwa in the final. Compete as the number 2 seed, they can reach the knock-uot stage after place second in the group stage lose a match to Danish pair Christinna Pedersen and Kamilla Rytter Juhl. They also won the women's doubles title in Korea, All England, and Hong Kong Open.

In 2013, she won the women's doubles title at the Malaysia Open teamed-up with Bao Yixin. She also won the Singapore Open and became the runner-up at the French Open with Zhao Yunlei. In 2014, she and Zhao won the Superseries Premier title at the Indonesia Open. They won the title without even having to hold a racket in the final round, following their opponent Ma Jin withdrew from the match after suffered an injury. In August 2014, she and Zhao won the gold medal at the World Championships in Copenhagen after beat their compatriots Wang Xiaoli and Yu Yang. At the end of the 2014 BWF Superseries, they qualified to compete at the Dubai World Superseries Finals. They finally became the runner-up after lose to Japanese pair Misaki Matsutomo and Ayaka Takahashi in the final.

In 2015, she defend her title at the Indonesia Open with different partner (Tang Jinhua). She also defended her title at the Hong Kong Open and World Championships with Zhao Yunlei. In 2016, Tian who ranked No. 3 in the world partnered with Zhao Yunlei, was not listed on the player rooster to compete at the 2016 Rio Olympics. Their names replaced by Luo Ying and Luo Yu who are currently ranked No. 7. Zhao who plays in two sectors and the match schedule into consideration to Chinese Olympic Committee. In September 2016, she reported her retirement in the Chinese Press.

Personal life 
Tian is married to Zhang Nan in November 2018.

Achievements

Olympic Games 
Women's doubles

BWF World Championships 
Women's doubles

Asian Games 
Women's doubles

Asian Championships 
Women's doubles

Mixed doubles

Summer Universiade 
Women's doubles

Mixed doubles

World Junior Championships 
Girls' doubles

BWF Superseries 
The BWF Superseries, which was launched on 14 December 2006 and implemented in 2007, is a series of elite badminton tournaments, sanctioned by the Badminton World Federation (BWF). BWF Superseries levels are Superseries and Superseries Premier. A season of Superseries consists of twelve tournaments around the world that have been introduced since 2011. Successful players are invited to the Superseries Finals, which are held at the end of each year.

Women's doubles

Mixed doubles

  BWF Superseries Finals tournament
  BWF Superseries Premier tournament
  BWF Superseries tournament

BWF Grand Prix 
The BWF Grand Prix had two levels, the BWF Grand Prix and Grand Prix Gold. It was a series of badminton tournaments sanctioned by the Badminton World Federation (BWF) which was held from 2007 to 2017.

Women's doubles

  BWF Grand Prix Gold tournament
  BWF Grand Prix tournament

BWF International Challenge/Series 
Women's doubles

  BWF International Challenge tournament
  BWF International Series tournament

References

External links 

 
 
 Tian Qing Biography at gz2010.cn

1986 births
Living people
People from Yiyang
Badminton players from Hunan
Chinese female badminton players
Badminton players at the 2012 Summer Olympics
Olympic badminton players of China
Olympic gold medalists for China
Olympic medalists in badminton
Medalists at the 2012 Summer Olympics
Badminton players at the 2010 Asian Games
Badminton players at the 2014 Asian Games
Asian Games gold medalists for China
Asian Games bronze medalists for China
Asian Games medalists in badminton
Medalists at the 2010 Asian Games
Medalists at the 2014 Asian Games
Universiade silver medalists for China
Universiade medalists in badminton
Medalists at the 2007 Summer Universiade
Medalists at the 2013 Summer Universiade
World No. 1 badminton players
21st-century Chinese women